Air-Sea Battle is a game developed by Atari, Inc. for the Atari VCS (renamed to the Atari 2600 in 1982), and was one of the nine original launch titles for that system when it was released in September 1977.  It was published by Sears as Target Fun and was the pack-in game with the original Sears Tele-Games version of the Atari VCS.

Gameplay
There are six basic types of games available in Air-Sea Battle and, for each type, there are one or two groups of three games, for a total of twenty-seven game variants. Within each group, variant one is the standard game, variant two features guided missiles which can be directed left or right after being fired, and variant three pits a single player (using the right gun) against a computer opponent, which simply fires continuously at the default angle or speed. In every game, players shoot targets (enemy planes or ships, shooting gallery targets, or each other, depending on the game chosen) competing to get a higher score. Each round lasts two minutes and sixteen seconds; the player with the higher score after time expires is the winner, unless one player wins (and ends the game) by reaching 99 points before the time is up.

Anti-aircraft games
Variants 1–6 are anti-aircraft games, in which the player uses a stationary anti-aircraft gun that can be positioned at a 30, 60, or 90-degree angle to shoot down four different types of aircraft. The planes typically appear in groups of three to five, and once every plane in a formation has been destroyed, a new formation appears. There are two groups of anti-aircraft games: in variants 1–3, each target hit is worth 1 point, while in 4–6, the various types of aircraft have different point values. Additionally, zero-point blimps are added as obstacles in games 4–6.

Torpedo games
The torpedo games (7–12) are similar to the anti-aircraft games, except that each player mans a submarine that can move left and right and fires at a 90 degree angle. The targets are ships instead of planes. As with the anti-aircraft games, in games 7–9, all targets are worth one point, while games 10–12 have variable point values for targets and additional zero-point obstacles.

Shooting gallery games
The shooting gallery games (13–15) differ from the previous variants in that the player can both set the angle of the gun and move the gun left and right. Instead of planes or ships, clowns, ducks, and rabbits are the targets, with point values of 1, 2, and 3 respectively.

Polaris games
The polaris games (16–18) put the player in control of a boat which moves back and forth across the bottom of the screen automatically. Instead of controlling the gun angle, the player controls the speed at which the ship moves, attempting to shoot the same fleets of planes as in the anti-aircraft variants, with the point values of games 4–6.

Bomber games
In the bomber games (19–21), the player-controlled vehicle is a plane flying near the top of the screen dropping bombs on the ships from the torpedo games. As in the polaris games, the plane's speed is controlled by the player, and the point values are identical to those in games 10–12.

Polaris vs. bomber games
In the polaris vs. bomber games (22–27), one player controls the ship from the polaris games while the other controls the plane from the bomber games, with the goal being to destroy the other player's craft. Games 25–27 feature zero-point mines as obstacles.

Reception
The cartridge was reviewed by Video magazine in its "Arcade Alley" column where it was praised as "the ultimate game for people who enjoy blowing things up". Torpedo variant #11 was noted in particular as the best game on the cartridge, with "addiction to this one [being] common". The most significant criticism was in regard to the computer's inability to handle guided missile controls in solo-play, and the authors recommended playing the normally 2-player Torpedo variant #11 as a solo game if the player wished to experience a solitaire guided missile game.

Legacy
Air-Sea Battle appears on the Atari Anthology collection for Xbox and PlayStation 2 and the Atari Flashback dedicated console.

See also
 Anti-Aircraft (video game)

References

External links
Air-Sea Battle at Atari Mania

1977 video games
Atari 2600 games
Fixed shooters
Multiplayer and single-player video games
Video games developed in the United States